Freddie Robert Warren (born 2 November 1992) is an English footballer who plays as a midfielder.

Career
Warren began his career at Charlton Athletic, and was given a professional contract in March 2011. After several loan spells away from the club, he was released at the end of the 2011–12 season and joined Barnet, where he made his debut against Birmingham City in the Football League Cup on 14 August 2012. He joined Hastings United on loan on 28 March 2013, making eight appearances, but was unable to save them from relegation from the Isthmian Premier Division. On 21 September 2013, he joined Canvey Island on loan for a month. Warren was released by the Bees at the end of the 2013–14 season, playing only five times in his two seasons at the club. Manager Martin Allen said: "I am currently undecided on Freddie. He has done well in both games he has played but at 21 he needs to be playing regular football which I cannot guarantee him. He has a terrific attitude but is at a crossroads because of his age in terms of what direction he should go in".

Warren signed for Canvey Island permanently on 6 June 2014. He joined East Thurrock United in November 2015.

References

External links
 
 

1992 births
Living people
English footballers
Association football midfielders
Charlton Athletic F.C. players
Staines Town F.C. players
Concord Rangers F.C. players
Kettering Town F.C. players
Bromley F.C. players
Hayes & Yeading United F.C. players
Barnet F.C. players
Hastings United F.C. players
Canvey Island F.C. players
East Thurrock United F.C. players
English Football League players
National League (English football) players
Isthmian League players